The Aberdare Urban District Council was established in 1894 and covered the parish of Aberdare. Its responsibilities included public health, sanitation, roads and public works generally.

There were five wards, namely Aberaman (also known as No. 5 Ward), Blaengwawr (also known as No. 4 Ward), Gadlys (also known as No. 2 Ward), Llwydcoed (also known as No. 1 Ward), and the Town Ward (also known as No. 3 Ward).  At this time, one member was elected from each ward on an annual basis.

An election was held in April 1903. It was preceded by the 1902 election and followed by the 1904 election. The term of office of members elected at the 1900 election came to an end and those elected were to serve until 1906.

The election was notable for the breakthrough made by the Labour Party.

(*) denotes sitting member

Results

Aberaman Ward

Blaengwawr Ward

Gadlys Ward

Llwydcoed Ward

Town Ward

References

Bibliography
 
 
 

1903
1903 Welsh local elections